Kitava is one of the four major islands in the Trobriand Islands archipelago group of the Solomon Sea, located in Milne Bay Province of southeastern Papua New Guinea.

Ethnography
The inhabitants of this island and their lifestyle and diet have been the subject of study by researcher Staffan Lindeberg and his colleagues, due to their reported excellent health and traditional diet. Lindeberg et al. have published several works in peer-reviewed journals outlining their discoveries.

See also

Notes

References
Kitava at WikiMapia
Health of the Uratu Island Reef, Kitava, Papua New Guinea

Trobriand Islands
Islands of Milne Bay Province